DFDS Seaways is a Danish shipping company that operates passenger and freight services across northern Europe. Following the acquisition of Norfolkline in 2010, DFDS restructured its other shipping divisions (DFDS Tor Line and DFDS Lisco) into the previously passenger-only operation of DFDS Seaways.

History 
DFDS Seaways renewed its fleet in 2006, purchasing MS King of Scandinavia and MS Princess of Norway to replace the last ships still in service that dated from the 1970s. The company has acquired a reputation for purchasing used ships, as well as for taking over the build contracts or taking delivery of newbuilds originally ordered by other companies. The last time DFDS Seaways ordered a newbuild of its own was in 1978. DFDS Seaways stopped serving Sweden in 2006, when MS Princess of Scandinavia was taken out of service and the Copenhagen–Oslo service stopped calling at Helsingborg. In May 2008, DFDS made public its plan to close down the loss-making United Kingdom–Norway service on 1 September 2008. MS Queen of Scandinavia, the ship that was used in the service, has since been chartered to St Peter Line.

In July 2010, DFDS acquired Norfolkline from Maersk. The Norfolkline routes and vessels were integrated into DFDS Seaways. DFDS Seaways now had the Dover–Dunkirk route, and launched the new Dover–Calais route in February 2012.

DFDS announced in 2015 that it had unveiled a new logo, which saw 'DFDS' in a new font, and the logo with the white Maltese cross losing its outer circle; it announced furthermore that the DFDS Seaways subsidiary would be shortened to just 'DFDS' carrying a dark blue hull in the same font instead of the traditional light blue hull, and a Maltese cross with a circle. The first vessels to receive the new livery—and the new name scheme that would eventually be rolled out throughout the whole fleet—were the former MyFerryLink ferries Rodin (soon to become Cote des Dunes) and the Berlioz (soon to become the Cote des Flandres). All the fleet were to lose the 'Seaways' suffix from their names, and would instead receive local preference names..

In 2018, DFDS ordered three RoPax newbuild vessels - one was an E-Flexer on charter from Stena RoRo which entered service as the Côte d'Opale in August 2021, and two RoPaxes for Baltic Sea operations. The first of the Baltic twins, named Aura Seaways, was launched in late 2020, and had an inclination test in 2021. The sea trials took place in the middle of 2021. Now 2 new ferries "Aura Seaways" and " Luna Seaways" cruise Klaipėda - Karlshamn line.

In September 2019, DFDS had announced that it would add two new ships, the MS Moby Wonder and MS Moby Aki, to the Newcastle–IJmuiden route in early 2020. The former ships, the MS King Seaways and MS Princess Seaways, would in turn have been sold to Moby Lines. This plan was later abandoned in October 2019 due to Moby Lines being unable to commit to the delivery of the ships with ongoing financial issues over vessel mortgages.

Routes 
DFDS Seaways operates twenty routes across the North Sea and Baltic Sea and one route between France to Republic of Ireland.

Passenger and freight 

Dover–Calais
Dover–Dunkirk
Dunkirk-Rosslare
Newhaven–Dieppe
Newcastle–IJmuiden
Copenhagen–Frederikshavn-Oslo
Klaipėda–Kiel
Klaipėda–Karlshamn
Paldiski–Kapellskär

Freight-only routes 
Brevik–Ghent
Brevik–Immingham
Cuxhaven–Immingham
Esbjerg–Immingham
Gothenburg–Ghent
Gothenburg–Immingham
Gothenburg–Tilbury
Gothenburg – Zeebrugge
Klaipėda–Køge–Fredericia
Marseille–Tunis
Saint Petersburg–Ust-Luga–Kiel
Sheerness–Calais
Vlaardingen–Felixstowe
Vlaardingen–Immingham

Fleet 
DFDS Seaways operates a large fleet of Ro-Ro, Ro-Pax and Cruise ferries. Following restructuring in 2010, all shipping activities (including those of DFDS Tor Line and DFDS Lisco) were rebranded as DFDS Seaways.

Current fleet

Former ships 
{| class="wikitable"
! Ship || In service || Tonnage || Status
|-
| MS Skipper Clement|| 1964–1976 ||align="Center" |  || Scrapped 2010.
|-
| [[MS Akershus|MS Akershus]]|| 1965–1973 ||align="Center" |  || Burnt and sunk 1989.
|-
| MS Winston Churchill || 1967–1996 ||align="Center" |  || Scrapped 2004.
|-
| MS Kong Olav V|| 1968–1984 ||align="Center" |  || Burnt 1993, later scrapped.
|-
| MS Prinsesse Margrethe|| 1968–1983 ||align="Center" |  || Scrapped 2005.
|-
| MS AalborgshusMS Dana SirenaMS Dana Corona|| 1969–19711971–19781978–1985 ||align="Center" |  || Scrapped in China, 2000.
|-
| MS TrekronerMS Dana CoronaMS Dana Sirena|| 1970–19711971–19791979–1983 ||align="Center" |  || Sunk 1994.
|-
| MS Dana Regina || 1974–1990 ||align="Center" |  || Since 1998 MS Vana Tallinn with Tallink. The ship was scrapped at Aliga, Turkey in 2014.
|-
| MS Dana AngliaMS Duke of Scandinavia || 1978–20022002–2006 ||align="Center" |  || Since 2009 MS Moby Corse with Moby Lines.
|-
| MS Dana GloriaMS King of Scandinavia|| 1981–1984, 1986–19891989–1994 ||align="Center" | > || 2006-2017 MS Jupiter for Royal Group Ltd. Sunk 2017.
|-
| MS Tor ScandinaviaMS Princess of Scandinavia || 1981–19911991–2006 ||align="Center" |  || Since 2006 MS Moby Otta with Moby Lines.
|-
| MS Scandinavia || 1982–1985 ||align="Center" |  || Since 2002 MS Island Escape with Island Cruises.
|-
| MS Tor BritanniaMS Prince of Scandinavia|| 1982–19901990–2003 ||align="Center" |  || Since 2003 MS Moby Drea with Moby Lines.
|-
| MS HamburgMS Admiral of Scandinavia|| 1987–19971997–2002 ||align="Center" |  || Originally MS Kronprins Harald with Jahre Line (1976-1987); Since 2002 MS Caribbean Express with Access Ferries; Scrapped 2011 in India.
|-
| MS Duchess of Scandinavia || 2003–2005 ||align="Center" |  || From 2008 to 2014 MS Bergensfjord with Fjord Line. To be renamed Oslofjord 2014.
|-
| MS Dieppe Seaways || 2012–2014 ||align="Center" |  || Sold to Stena Line in Nov 2014. Renamed MS Stena Superfast X. Entered Service 09/03/2015.
|-
|  ||align="Center" | 2013-2021 || align="Center"| || Sold to Irish Ferries in November 2021. Renamed Isle of Innisfree.
|-
|}

 Accidents and incidents 

 Victoria Seaways 2013 fire 
On 23 April 2013, Victoria Seaways caught fire whilst on passage between Kiel, Germany and Klaipeda in Lithuania. The fire was discovered on the main vehicle deck at around midnight on the 22/23 April. The ship's fire-extinguishing system took control of the fire quickly, and passengers were sent to muster stations whilst the fire was put out. The ship continued to Klaipeda shortly after. The cause of the incident is unknown.

 Sirena Seaways 2013 dock collision 
On 22 June 2013, Sirena Seaways, with 489 passengers on board, collided with the dockside at Harwich, Essex. The incident caused damage to the dockside, the loading ramp and the ship, resulting in the vessel taking on water. The crew blocked the opening from inside and the watertight compartments were used to prevent the ship from capsizing. The Harwich RNLI lifeboat, Walton Coastguard rescue team and an RAF search and rescue helicopter from Wattisham Airfield responded to the incident, along with a number of other vessels nearby. The ferry was brought alongside at 14:45 and the passengers were disembarked. The cause of the collision is unknown.

 Britannia Seaways 2013 fire 
On Saturday 16 November 2013, Britannia Seaways caught fire in the North Sea, trapping 32 crew on board. Helicopters despatched from Norway were unable to take the crew off the ship, owing to bad weather conditions. The fire began in a container on one of the upper decks, and was extinguished 13 hours after it broke out. The ship was carrying military equipment to Norway for a military exercise, and reached Bergen a few days later. No injuries were reported. The cause of the fire is unknown and under investigation.

 Corona Seaways 2013 fire 
On 4 December 2013, at 02:30, Corona Seaways caught fire whilst the vessel was travelling from Fredericia to Copenhagen. The fire broke out in the main closed deck, and was briefly under control with the ships sprinkler systems before flaring up again. The ship arrived at Helsingborg at 07.00, where the fire was extinguished by the local fire services. No injuries were reported amongst the 10 passengers and 19 crew members. The cause of the fire is unknown and under investigation.

 King Seaways 2013 fire 
On 28 December 2013, a cabin aboard the ferry King Seaways caught fire while it was approximately 30 miles off Flamborough Head whilst travelling to IJmuiden, the Netherlands.  The fire started at 22:45 GMT on Saturday and was extinguished within 15 minutes. RAF rescue helicopters from RAF Boulmer and RAF Leconfield winched two passengers and four crew off the ship. The vessel returned to North Shields on Sunday morning.  The cause is still under investigation however two people have been arrested in connection with the fire.  One was subsequently charged with arson reckless to endangering life, and affray.  On 8 July 2014 it was reported that one of them had pleaded guilty in Newcastle Crown Court to a charge of arson being reckless as to whether life was endangered.

 Crown Seaways 2014 engine incident 
On 27 April 2014, Crown Seaways experienced engine problems near the Danish island of Anholt, whilst travelling between Copenhagen and Oslo. It is reported that passengers heard a loud bang, a shudder and smoke at about 21:30, when the vessel suffered an engine failure and crank explosion. The ship soon continued on its way towards Oslo. The cause of the incident is unknown.

 Dover Seaways 2014 dock collision 
On 10 November 2014, Dover Seaways collided with a harbour wall at the Port of Dover, shortly after leaving the port at 08:00. The ship was heading to Dunkirk carrying 320 passengers. Several passengers were treated with minor injuries, and four were taken to hospital for additional treatment. The cause of the collision is unknown.

 City of Rotterdam / Primula 2015 collision 
The City of Rotterdam'' car carrier collided with Primula Seaways in the Humber estuary in December 2015.

Closure of the Harwich - Esbjerg route 

The Harwich - Esbjerg route was closed on 29 September 2014 due to a decline in passenger numbers. The Harwich - Esbjerg route had operated since 1875. This was the last service operated by DFDS from Harwich and was also the last passenger service between Great Britain and Denmark; DFDS continue to operate freight services from Immingham to Denmark. DFDS Seaways reported that MS Sirena Seaways will move on other duties on the route between Kapellskar, Sweden and Paldiski, Estonia. A petition has been set up to attempt to show DFDS that there is a demand for the route.

References

Notes

Bibliography 

Ferry companies of Belgium
Ferry companies of Denmark
Ferry companies of England
Ferry companies of France
Ferry companies of Germany
Ferry companies of Lithuania
Ferry companies of the Netherlands
Ferry companies of Norway
Ferry companies of Russia
Ferry companies of Scotland
Ferry companies of Sweden
DFDS
Connections across the English Channel

fr:DFDS Seaways
nl:DFDS Seaways
sv:DFDS Seaways